The names of the Scythians are a topic of interest for classicists and linguists. The Scythians were an Iranian peoples best known for dominating much of the Pontic steppe from about 700 BC to 400 BC. The name of the Scythians is believed to be of Indo-European origin and to have meant "archer". The Scythians gave their name to the region of Scythia. The Persians referred to all Iranian nomads of the steppes, including the Scythians, as Sakas. Some modern scholars apply the name Scythians to all peoples of the Scytho-Siberian world, but this terminology is controversial.

Etymology 

The collective endonym of the Scythians, was formed by the addition of the suffix , which denoted the plural form.

From  were descended the following exonyms:
 Old Persian:  
 Ancient Greek:   (plural  ), used by the Ancient Greeks
 The Ole Armenian:   is based on itacistic Greek

A late Scythian sound change from /δ/ to /l/ resulted in the evolution of  into , from which was derived the collective endonym of the Scythians at a later date, formed by the addition of the plural suffix .

Other sound changes have produced  .

From an Iranian verbal root sak-, "go, roam" and thus meaning "nomad" was derived the term Saka, from which came the names:
 Old Persian:  , used by the ancient Persians to designate all nomads of the Eurasian steppe, including the Scythians
  , meaning "the  who live beyond the (Black) Sea," was used specifically to designate the Pontic Scythians
 Ancient Greek:  
 Latin: 
 Sanskrit:  
 Old Chinese:

Identification 

The name  was used by the ancient Persian to refer to all the Iranian nomadic tribes living to the north of their empire, including both those who lived between the Caspian Sea and the Hungry steppe, and those who lived to the north of the Danube and the Black Sea. The Assyrians meanwhile called these nomads the Ishkuzai, and the Ancient Greeks called them Skuthai.

However, following Darius I's campaign of 520 to 518 BC against the Asian nomads, they were differentiated into two groups, both living in Central Asia to the east of the Caspian Sea:
 the  – " who wear pointed caps," who have been identified with the Massagetae, and possibly with the Dahae as well.
 the  – interpreted as " who lay hauma (around the fire)", which can be interpreted as " who revere hauma."

A third name was added after the Darius's campaign north of the Danube:
 the  – " who live beyond the (Black) Sea", who were the Pontic Scythians of the East European steppes

An additional term is found in two inscriptions elsewhere:
 the  – " who are beyond Sogdia", a term was used by Darius for the people who formed the north-eastern limits of his empire at the opposite end to satrapy of Kush (the Ethiopians). These  have been suggested to have been the same people as the 

Moreover, Darius the Great's Suez Inscriptions mention two group of Sakas:
 the  – " of the Marshes"
 the  – " of the Land"

Late antiquity
In Late Antiquity and the Middle Ages, the name "Scythians" was used in Greco-Roman and Byzantine literature for various groups of nomadic "barbarians" living on the Pontic-Caspian steppe who were not related to the actual Scythians, such as the Huns, Goths, Ostrogoths, Turkic peoples, Pannonian Avars, Slavs, and Khazars.> For example, Byzantine sources referred to the Rus' raiders who attacked Constantinople in 860 AD in contemporary accounts as "Tauroscythians" because of their geographical origin, and despite their lack of any ethnic relation to Scythians.

Modern terminology 

The Scythians were part of the wider Scytho-Siberian world, stretching across the Eurasian Steppes of Kazakhstan, the Russian steppes of the Siberian, Ural, Volga and Southern regions, and eastern Ukraine. In a broader sense, Scythians has also been used to designate all early Eurasian nomads, although the validity of such terminology is controversial, and other terms such as "Early nomadic" have been deemed preferable.

Although the Scythians, Saka and Cimmerians were closely related nomadic Iranian peoples, and the ancient Babylonians, ancient Persians and ancient Greeks respectively used the names "Cimmerian," "Saka," and "Scythian" for all the steppe nomads, and early modern historians such as Edward Gibbon mistakenly used the term Scythian to refer to a variety of nomadic and semi-nomadic peoples across the Eurasian steppe, the name "Scythian" in contemporary modern scholarship generally refers to the nomadic Iranian people who dominated the Pontic steppe from the 7th century BC to the 3rd century BC, while the name "Saka" is used specifically for their eastern members who inhabited the northern and eastern Eurasian Steppe and the Tarim Basin; and while the Cimmerians were often described by contemporaries as culturally Scythian, they formed a different tribe from the Scythians proper, to whom the Cimmerians were related, and who also displaced and replaced the Cimmerians in the Pontic Steppe.

The Scythians share several cultural similarities with other populations living to their east, in particular similar weapons, horse gear and Scythian art, which has been referred to as the Scythian triad. Cultures sharing these characteristics have often been referred to as Scythian cultures, and its peoples called Scythians. Peoples associated with Scythian cultures include not only the Scythians themselves, who were a distinct ethnic group, but also Cimmerians, Massagetae, Saka, Sarmatians and various obscure peoples of the forest steppe, such as early Slavs, Balts and Finnic peoples. Within this broad definition of the term Scythian, the actual Scythians have often been distinguished from other groups through the terms Classical Scythians, Western Scythians, European Scythians or Pontic Scythians.

Scythologist Askold Ivantchik notes with dismay that the term "Scythian" has been used within both a broad and a narrow context, leading to a good deal of confusion. He reserves the term "Scythian" for the Iranian people dominating the Pontic steppe from the 7th century BC to the 3rd century BC. Nicola Di Cosmo writes that the broad concept of "Scythian" to describe the early nomadic populations of the Eurasian steppe is "too broad to be viable," and that the term "early nomadic" is preferable.

See also
 Names of the Celts
 Name of the Goths
 Names of the Greeks
 Name of the Franks

Notes and sources

Notes

Sources

 
 
 
 
 
 
 
 
 
 
 
 
 

 
 
 
 

Scythians
Name